Saranta Kolones is a ruined medieval fortress inside the Paphos Archaeological Park and it is located just north of the harbour of Paphos, on the island of Cyprus. It takes its name from the large number of granite columns that were found on the site and probably once formed part of the ancient agora. The Byzantine castle is believed to have been built at the end of the 7th century AD to protect the port and the city of Nea Pafos from Arab raids and later remodeled by the Lusignans. The Fortress had a three-metre thick wall with four huge corner towers and another four intermediary towers along the joining walls and moat surrounding the castle. Access was across a wooden bridge spanning the moat. The square courtyard measured 35 metres long by 35 metres wide, with a tower at each corner. The main entrance was through a fifth, horseshoe-shaped tower on the east side. Destroyed by an earthquake in 1222, the castle was subsequently abandoned.  In modern times a series of excavations have taken place.

References

External links

 Saranta Kolones

Buildings and structures in Paphos
Castles in Cyprus